José Antonio García Robledo (born 21 September 1998) is a Honduran professional footballer who plays as a defender for Olimpia.

International career
He represented Honduras at the 2017 CONCACAF U-20 Championship, 2017 FIFA U-20 World Cup, 2019 Pan American Games and the 2020 Summer Olympics.

He made his debut for the Honduras national football team on 2 September 2021 in a World Cup qualifier against Canada, a 1–1 away draw. He substituted Brayan Moya in the 88th minute.

References

Living people
1998 births
Honduran footballers
Honduras youth international footballers
Honduras international footballers
Liga Nacional de Fútbol Profesional de Honduras players
C.D. Victoria players
C.D. Olimpia players
C.D. Real de Minas players
Footballers at the 2020 Summer Olympics
Olympic footballers of Honduras
Association football defenders
Pan American Games medalists in football
Pan American Games silver medalists for Honduras
Medalists at the 2019 Pan American Games
Footballers at the 2019 Pan American Games